John Stewart Williams (4 January 1911 – 12 December 1964) was an English first-class cricketer and solicitor.

Williams was born at South Croydon in January 1911. He was educated at Repton School, before going up to Wadham College, Oxford. While studying at Oxford, he played first-class cricket for Oxford University, making four appearances in 1931 against Leicestershire, Gloucestershire, the Free Foresters and the touring New Zealanders. Playing as a right-arm slow bowler, he took six wickets in his four matches at an average of 38.16 and best figures of 2 for 49.

He became a solicitor after graduating from Oxford and was admitted to practice in 1936. Williams served in the Second World War, being commissioned as a second lieutenant in the Corps of Military Police in May 1941. Following the war, he returned to legal practice and succeeded the post of solicitor to the Metropolitan Police in 1961. Williams died three years later in December 1964 at Haywards Heath.

References

External links

1911 births
1964 deaths
Cricketers from Croydon
People educated at Repton School
Alumni of Wadham College, Oxford
English cricketers
Oxford University cricketers
English solicitors
Royal Military Police officers
British Army personnel of World War II
20th-century English lawyers